Geurie railway station is located on the Main Western line in New South Wales, Australia. It serves the village of Geurie, opening in 1885 as Ponto. It was renamed Geurie on 1 January 1889.

Services
Geurie is served by NSW TrainLink's daily Central West XPT service operating between Sydney and Dubbo.

See also
Geurie crossing loop collision

References

External links
Geurie station details Transport for New South Wales

Railway stations in Australia opened in 1885
Regional railway stations in New South Wales
Main Western railway line, New South Wales
Dubbo Regional Council